is a Japanese sports manga by Yū Koyama about Genki Horiguchi, a boy who is raised by a single father, and who wants to be a boxer like him. It was adapted as an anime television series by Toei Animation. The manga received the Shogakukan Manga Award for shōnen in 1977.

Cast
 – Toshiko Fujita
 – Makio Inoue
 – Katsuji Mori
 – Kazuko Sugiyama
 – Shūichi Ikeda
 – Hiroshi Masuoka
 – Keiko Han
 a.k.a. Coach Nagano – Hiroshi Ōtake
Takashi Kazan – Tōru Furuya
 – Ichirō Nagai
 – Shima Sakai

References

External links
 Official Toei site 
 

1976 manga
1980 anime television series debuts
Boxing in anime and manga
Fuji TV original programming
Shogakukan manga
Shōnen manga
Toei Animation television
Winners of the Shogakukan Manga Award for shōnen manga
Yū Koyama